Roy Scott Dunbar is an American astronomer, planetologist and discoverer of comets and minor planets. 

Dunbar played an active role in the Palomar Planet-Crossing Asteroid Survey. The Minor Planet Center credits him with the (co-)discovery of 10 numbered minor planets during 1981–1987. 

His most notable discoveries include the potentially hazardous object and Aten asteroid 3362 Khufu, which he co-discovered with Maria A. Barucci, as well as the near-Earth object, Mars-crosser and Aten asteroid, 3551 Verenia. Together with Eleanor Helin he co-discovered the minor planets 3360 Syrinx, 6065 Chesneau, 6435 Daveross and 7163 Barenboim.

Dunbar and Helin also claimed the discovery of comet 1980 p, which turned out not to exist. It was a ghost image of Alpha Leonis.

The main-belt asteroid 3718 Dunbar, discovered by Eleanor Helin and Schelte Bus, is named after him. Naming citation was published on 2 April 1988.

References

External links 
 Report and disconfirmation of ghost discovery 1980 p

American astronomers
Discoverers of asteroids

Living people
Year of birth missing (living people)